Chutove Raion (translit.: Chutivs'kyi Raion) was a raion (district) in Poltava Oblast in central Ukraine. The raion's administrative center was the urban-type settlement of Chutove. The raion was abolished and its territory was merged into Poltava Raion on 18 July 2020 as part of the administrative reform of Ukraine, which reduced the number of raions of Poltava Oblast to four. The last estimate of the raion population was 

Important rivers within the raion included the Kolomak and the Orchyk.

Settlements

References

Former raions of Poltava Oblast
1923 establishments in Ukraine
Ukrainian raions abolished during the 2020 administrative reform